Kentucky Route 1230 (KY 1230) is a  state highway in the U.S. State of Kentucky. Its southern terminus is at the end of state maintenance in Louisville and its northern terminus is at KY 1934 and KY 6146 in Louisville.

Major junctions

References

1230
1230
Transportation in Louisville, Kentucky